Gualtiero "Rino" Giori (1913–1992) was an Italian security printer and inventor who founded the company Giori SA in 1951.

Life
Giori came from a family of security printers. In 1876, his grandfather had bought a printing company in Milan and had gone on to turn it into a supplier of such documents as share certificates and cheques.

In the 1930s, Giori was already an intaglio printer, marked out by great skills as a salesman and inventor. After the Second World War he offered a new concept in multicolour intaglio printing combined with a liquid wiping system. By 1947 Giori had developed the first ever six-colour intaglio printing press, designed to print banknotes which combined more artistic possibilities with greater security. In 1949, some of his new machines were sold to the Argentinian security printer Casa de la Moneda. In 1951 Giori founded his own security printing company, Giori SA, and the next year he entered into a collaborative agreement with the long-established German firm of Koenig & Bauer for printing banknotes and security documents. Giori established an immediate rapport with the chairman of Koenig, Hans Bolza, and while the deal they signed in 1952 was preliminary to a long-term agreement of collaboration which came six years later, from the outset the terms were astonishingly favourable to Giori, a sign of how worried the company was by the advances he had made and the potential for loss of business. At the outset Koenig & Bauer surrendered to Giori all its distribution rights, even in Germany, and also all patent rights to the new Giori machines they planned to build together. In return, Koenig had the exclusive rights to manufacture Giori machines.

In another unexpected development, Giori proved to be much better than Koenig & Bauer at managing his cashflow and became a kind of informal banker to the German company, lending it large amounts of money, sometimes within hours of being asked. As Koenig & Bauer increased its capital with new share issues, Giori bought shares and slowly became a major shareholder, without any reciprocal investment in his own company by the Germans.

Later in the 1950s Giori launched the Simultan offset press, able to print three line images in three different colours in a single pass over the surface to be printed.

In 1965 Giori established a joint venture with De La Rue called De La Rue Giori. Based in Switzerland, it specialized in building banknote printing equipment.

In 2001 Giori SA was acquired by Koenig & Bauer, part of which was renamed KBA Giori.

Private life
He was a very generous  and proud man who  loved beautiful things and women. He was married more than three times but the following are his recognized  marriages  first to Mariuccia, mother of his  daughter Daniela and son Roberto, next to the actress Rossella Falk, and finally to Marina Swarovski. He married Falk in 1976, but they were divorced in 1980. He has various grandchildren but the ones who have shared part of his life and experiences are Andrea and Elena, Daniela's children, his eldest daughter.

References

1913 births
1992 deaths
Italian printers